Sawt al Jamahir (Arabic صوت الجماهير meaning Voice of the Masses) was a monthly newspaper published by the Iraqi-controlled Arab Liberation Front (ALF), a small Ba'athist faction within the Palestine Liberation Organization (PLO). It was edited by the ALF's Secretary-General Rakad Salem and was believed to have been funded by the Iraqi government. It was unclear if publication continued after the fall of Saddam Hussein in 2003 during the Iraq War.

References

Arabic-language newspapers
Ba'athism
Defunct newspapers published in Iraq
History of the Ba'ath Party
Monthly newspapers
Newspapers published in Iraq
Organization of the Ba'ath Party
Palestine Liberation Organization
Publications with year of establishment missing
Publications with year of disestablishment missing